Sanjiv Khanna  (born 14 May 1960) is a judge of the Supreme Court of India. He is a former judge of Delhi High Court.

Early life
He completed his schooling from Delhi's Modern School, Barakhamba Road in the year 1977. After graduating in the year 1980 from St. Stephen's College, University of Delhi, he studied law at Campus Law Centre of the Faculty of Law, University of Delhi. His father Justice Dev Raj Khanna retired as a judge from Delhi High Court in 1985 and his mother Mrs. Saroj Khanna worked as a Hindi lecturer at Lady Shri Ram College, Delhi University.

Career
He was enrolled as an Advocate in the Bar Council of Delhi in the year 1983. On 24 June 2005, he was elevated as an additional judge of Delhi High Court and made permanent on 20 February 2006. He was elevated as a judge of Supreme Court of India on 18 January 2019. He is in line to become the Chief Justice of India after the retirement of Chief Justice Dhananjaya Y. Chandrachud. Khanna is also the nephew of a former judge of the Supreme Court of India, Justice Hans Raj Khanna, who propounded the basic structure doctrine in 1973 and famously delivered the lone dissenting judgement in the ADM Jabalpur v. Shiv Kant Shukla case, popularly known as the Habeas Corpus case, in 1976 and was superseded to the office of the Chief Justice of India by M. H. Beg at the behest of the then Prime Minister Indira Gandhi, protesting which he resigned from the court in early 1977.

References 

1960 births
Living people
20th-century Indian judges
21st-century Indian judges
Indian judges
Judges of the Delhi High Court
Justices of the Supreme Court of India
Modern School (New Delhi) alumni
People from New Delhi